Merișani is a commune in Argeș County, Muntenia, Romania. It is composed of nine villages: Borlești, Brăteasca, Capu Piscului, Crâmpotani, Dobrogostea, Malu Vânăt, Merișani, Vărzaru and Vâlcelele.

History
Humans have inhabited the area that now belongs to the commune since the Neolithic.
In the Middle Ages, the oldest written evidence is from 1428. The church in Vărzaru village was built around 1620.

Location
The commune is situated in the centre of Argeș County, at about 15 km from Pitești and 25 km to Curtea de Argeș.

Geography
The commune is on the valley of the Argeș River, in a hilly region called Platforma Argeșului (in English, the Argeș Platform), part of the Getic Plateau. The climate is temperate, with frequent rains. Winters are usually cold, with plenty of snow, while summers have a moderate heat.

Demographics
The official data from the 2002 Census shows that the total population is of 4428 persons. The majority are Romanians (4252 or 96%). The second ethnic group are the Romani people (171 or 4%). There are 5 people with other nationalities. However, the representants of the Romani community say that the Romani population is over 1200 persons.

Transportation
The main way to get to Merișani is by car. There are a national road and several county roads. The railway is the other access way, but trains are very rare.

Economy
There are local resources, like oil, forests and large lakes. There is also a camp that could help tourist development.

Merişani is considered, however, the poorest commune in the county.

References

Communes in Argeș County
Localities in Muntenia